Liucuo (劉厝) is a historical name for an area located in Nantun District, Taichung, Taiwan. Situated on the bank of the Fazi River, it encompasses roughly the south end of Xinsheng Village.

History 
The name translates to "House of Liu". Liucuo is one of the first areas to be settled in Taichung, being recorded in early Japanese era maps.

參考文獻 

Geography of Taichung